Poul Reumert (26 March 1883 – 19 April 1968) was a Danish stage and film actor. An incredibly skilled theater actor who made a name for himself in major roles such as Elverhoj, Genboerne and Flegermusen. He debuted after theater school in 1902.

Selected filmography
 Afgrunden (1910)
 Gennem kamp til sejr (1911)
 Den store flyver (1911)
 Livets baal (1912)
 Manegens stjerne (1912)
 Den sorte kansler (1912)
 Det røde alfabet (1916)
 Häxan (1922)
 David Copperfield (1922)
 Lasse Mansson fra Skane (1923)
 Den gamle præst (1939)
 Frøken Kirkemus (1941)
 Søren Søndervold (1942)
 Afsporet (1942)
 General von Döbeln (1942)
 Det brændende spørgsmål (1943)
 Det ender med bryllup (1943)
 De tre skolekammerater (1944)
 Otte akkorder (1944)
 Affæren Birte (1945)
 The Swedenhielm Family (1947)
 For frihed og ret (1949)

References

External links

 Poul Reumert at Danskefilm.dk

Danish male stage actors
Danish male film actors
Danish male silent film actors
20th-century Danish male actors
Male actors from Copenhagen
1883 births
1968 deaths
Burials at Mariebjerg Cemetery